The Bahadur class tugboats are a series of service watercraft built by Goa Shipyard Limited, for the Indian Navy. They have a rated bollard pull of 10 tonnes.

Ships of the class

Specification
Gross tonnage: 100 tonnes
DWT: 17 tonnes

See also
Tugboats of the Indian Navy

References

External links
 http://2.imimg.com/data2/JK/HD/HTT-240/240_2011-06-22_451494.pdf 

Ships of the Indian Navy
Auxiliary ships of the Indian Navy
Tugs of the Indian Navy
Auxiliary tugboat classes